Will D. Allen (born August 5, 1978) is a former American football cornerback. Allen played college football at Syracuse. He was drafted in the first round of the 2001 NFL Draft by the New York Giants.

Allen has also played for the Miami Dolphins and New England Patriots.

Early years
Allen attended Corcoran High School in his hometown of Syracuse, New York, where he excelled in football and track.  He only played two years of varsity football, both at cornerback, but he managed to collect a career total of 17 interceptions, including a school-record 11 as a senior.  In addition, he also played wide receiver as a senior, catching 23 passes for 460 yards, a 20-yard average per-reception.  He helped lead his team to consecutive 10–1 seasons.  He was awarded first-team All-New York State and All-Central New York honors as a senior in 1995, and was a first-team all-conference cornerback in both seasons.  His high school selected him as Athlete of the Year for 1995–96.  Allen placed third in New York State with a 10.5 second time in the 100-meter dash in his senior year.

College career
Opting to remain in his hometown, Allen accepted an athletic scholarship to play football for the Syracuse University Orangemen.  After redshirting as a freshman in the 1996 season, Allen proved to be an outstanding cornerback and kickoff returner, playing in 43 games with 28 starts, including 28 starts in 31 games played over his final three seasons.  He is regarded as one of the fastest players to ever play for Syracuse, and recorded a 4.29 second time in the 40-yard dash.

Professional career

New York Giants
Allen was drafted in the first round of the 2001 NFL Draft by the New York Giants, where he played for his first five seasons from 2001 to 2005.  After the 2005 season, the Giants opted to sign free agent Sam Madison rather than re-sign Allen to a new contract.  Though Allen was capable of maintaining good position, he struggled to make interceptions (four interceptions after his rookie season).

Miami Dolphins

On March 19, 2006, Will signed a four-year, $12 million contract with the Miami Dolphins.
Though he has struggled to consistently produce interceptions he has made the reputation for being one of the best cover corners in the secondary.
As of week 17 of the 2008 NFL season Will Allen recorded three interceptions, the second of which he returned for what would be his first career defensive touchdown in a win by the Dolphins over the Denver Broncos. His final interception of the season came against the Buffalo Bills in Week 14 in a win by the Dolphins.

On May 26, 2009, Dolphins signed Will Allen to a $16.2 million extension through 2011. The deal included $10 million guaranteed.

In Week 6 in a game versus the New Orleans Saints, Allen injured his knee during the game. After the game, it was announced that Allen tore his ACL and was put on injured reserve.

Allen was arrested February 20, 2010 and charged with driving under the influence when he was stopped in a late-model Ferrari at 3:30 a.m. at the corner of Fifth Street and Alton Road, said Miami Beach police spokesman Detective Juan Sanchez.

According to the arrest report, Allen approached a police road-block and instead of following the detour, he kept driving toward a police car, stopping only two feet from it.

Allen was placed on injured reserve September 5, 2010 because of a knee, just one week before season opener ending his 2010 season.

Allen would go on to restructure his contract with the team. He was set to make $5.5 million in 2011, and took a pay cut to come back. The 11-year veteran has battled injury problems of late, and should be the team’s nickel back behind Vontae Davis and Sean Smith.

On September 3, 2011, the Dolphins terminated Allen's contract.

The Dolphins re-signed Will Allen on September 14, 2011, after releasing Benny Sapp.

New England Patriots
Allen signed with the New England Patriots on March 21, 2012  to a one-year contract for the NFL minimum. He was placed on injured reserve on August 27, 2012.

Arrest and conviction
In 2015, Allen was arrested and charged with running a $35 million Ponzi scheme. The scheme allegedly involved giving loans to professional athletes. He and his partner Susan Daub pleaded guilty to federal fraud, conspiracy, and money laundering charges.

In March 2017, Allen was sentenced to 6 years in prison and ordered to pay $16.8 million in restitution.

References

1978 births
Living people
Players of American football from Syracuse, New York
American football cornerbacks
American money launderers
American people convicted of fraud
African-American players of American football
Syracuse Orange football players
New York Giants players
Miami Dolphins players
New England Patriots players
21st-century African-American sportspeople
20th-century African-American sportspeople